Longtake (Italian title: Pianosequenza) is a 2005 Italian film directed by Louis Nero.

Cast
Daniele Savoca: Paolo
Simona Nasi: Petra
Giorgia Cardaci: Wife
Pietro Di Legami: Gianni
Aldo Rendina: Sandro
Flavio Sciolè: Marco
Lola Gonzales: Michela
Tiziana Catalano: Mother

References

External links
 
 

Italian drama films
2005 films
Films directed by Louis Nero
2000s Italian films